Chiril may refer to:

 Chiril (name), a male given name
 Chiril, a village in Crucea Commune, Suceava County, Romania
 Chiril River (disambiguation), several rivers in Romania

See also
 Chirilov, a surname
 Chirilovca (disambiguation)